Berkane is a city in northeastern Morocco, in the tribal area of Aït Iznasen, limited by the Mediterranean to the north, the Kis river (Moroccan-Algerian border) and Oujda Province in the east, Nador Province to the west, and Taourirt Province in the south. It is the capital of Berkane Province.

Population
The city recorded a population of 109,237 in the 2014 Moroccan census. The inhabitants of Berkane originate primarily from Aït Iznasen, a major tribe which consists of Berber clans. The tribe's descendants are also spread over the rest of eastern Morocco, in cities like Ahfir, Saïdia and Oujda. The eastern dialect of Moroccan Arabic is spoken by most citizens, although Berber is also spoken by some people.

According to the 2014 census, the population of the Berkane agglomeration is 306,901, that is, an estimated 12.5 percent of the population of the eastern region, with a high density of 145.7 people per square kilometer compared to 25.7 people per square kilometer in relation to the region and a high urbanization rate of 63.2 percent.

Historic population
The population rose from 368 in 1917 to 3,600 in 1936 and then doubled in 1947, it reached 7,545, then jumped to 20,496 in 1960, then to 60,490 in 1982 and 77,026 in 1994. In the year 1996, the city's population was estimated at 82,000.

Etymology
The city takes its name from the patron saint of the city, Sidi Ahmad Aberkane (who died in 868 of the Islamic calendar). His last name (Berkane > Aberkane) means "black" in the Berber language.

Recent city
The city of Berkane is considered an agricultural city as a result of the irrigation policy that colonialism followed, starting in the middle of the first half of the twentieth century, in the major irrigated circles. Especially since it is located on one of the richest plains in Morocco, the Tarifa plain.

The emergence of Berkane as a city, and its development, was linked to the local agricultural wealth. However the administrative leadership of the fledgling city, which abolished the old political entities of the Aït Iznasen tribes, was behind the French political decision in the colonial period to assign the role of direct leadership to Berkane over the neighboring tribes. The development of the agricultural economy and the improvement of the standard of living in the city have contributed to emptying the tribes from their population and displacing the human weight from the mountain fortress to the open plain and facilitated the process of military control of the French occupation of the region. The massive influx of workers in the agriculture sector from different Moroccan regions has also disrupted the homogeneous tribal fabric.

Economy
Berkane is considered the capital of the citrus fruit industry of Morocco, and high-quality fresh fruit and vegetables are plentiful year round. It is known for its farms of clementines. Also, a large statue of an orange is at the center of town. It is very close to Saïdia, a popular beach resort town on the Mediterranean, as well as Tafoughalt, a small village in the nearby mountains known for its healthy air and herb markets.

Berkane is also a commercial and business strip. Ibn Sina/Rue Dehb or Alhob (meaning "The Street of Gold" or "Street of Love") is lined with many of the most popular cafes and jewelry shops. The city sprawls into the hillsides and connects via bridge to a small neighboring town, Sidi Slimane, giving the impression that it is much larger than the census claims.

Notable people
Abdelkader El Brazi, Former international goalkeeper
Aziz Bouhaddouz, International footballer
Fouzi Lekjaa, Football administrator and businessman 
Hicham El Guerrouj, Former olympic athlete, world record holder for the fastest mile also the current world record holder in the 1500m and 2000m 
Mohammed Hendouf, Moroccan-Belgian kickboxer

Twin towns – sister cities

Berkane is twinned with:
 Bondy, France
 Perpignan, France
 Saint-Gilles, Belgium
 Zeist, Netherlands

References

External links

Nador Rif News شبكة أخبار الناظور و الريف أريفينو.نت ; www.ariffino.net
Berkane entry in lexicorient
Berkane Fort Web Site

Populated places in Berkane Province
Municipalities of Morocco
Provincial capitals in Morocco